FK Lokomotíva Trnava is a Slovak football club, based in the town of Trnava.

References

External links
Official website 

Football clubs in Slovakia
Association football clubs established in 1935
1935 establishments in Slovakia